Dunderry is a village and townland in County Meath, Ireland, about  south-west of Navan. The village population was 170 at the 2016 census. The local Gaelic games club, Dunderry GAA Club, was formed in 1890 and competes in football, hurling and camogie.

References

Towns and villages in County Meath
Townlands of County Meath